Hannah Neise (born 26 May 2000) is a German skeleton racer who has competed since 2014. She is currently ranked 2nd worldwide in women's skeleton racing by the IBSF.

Career 
In 2021, Neise competed and won Gold at the Junior World Championships in St. Moritz.

In January 2022, it was announced that Neise would be competing in the 2022 Winter Olympics for Germany. In her first run, she got a time of 1:02.36, putting her at eighth place, but in her second run, she got a time of 1:02.19 putting her in first place of that run and second overall. In her third run, she got a time of 1:01.44, putting her in first place. In the fourth run, Neise placed first with a time of 1:01.63, putting her at a total of 4:07.62 leading her to win the gold medal for Germany. This was Germany's first gold medal in the sport of Skeleton at the Winter Olympics and the first time in sixteen years that a non-British athlete had won the Olympic gold.

World Cup results
All results are sourced from the International Bobsleigh and Skeleton Federation (IBSF).

References 

German female skeleton racers
2000 births
Living people
Skeleton racers at the 2016 Winter Youth Olympics
Skeleton racers at the 2022 Winter Olympics
Olympic skeleton racers of Germany
Medalists at the 2022 Winter Olympics
Olympic medalists in skeleton
Olympic gold medalists for Germany
21st-century German women